The 2011–12 Werder Bremen season began on 30 July against 1. FC Heidenheim.

Review and events

Friendlies
Werder Bremen started the 2011–12 season by beating lower division German side Meppen by 13–1. They then however lost against Danish side Midtjylland 5–4. They then beat Rot-Weiß Erfurt 2–1. They then drew 0–0 against Chemnitzer then beat SC Freiburg 4–3. They were held to a draw against Greek side Olympiacos and then lost to 3. Liga side Heidenheim 2-1. They then went on to beat Everton 1–0 and went past FC St. Pauli 5–4. They lost though against Fenerbahçe 1–0 and drew 2–2 to Union Berlin. In October, they beat VfL Osnabrück 3–0. They lost to Eintracht Braunschweig 2–1 and lost to Ajax and Hansa Rostock, but beat AZ 2–1.

Transfers Summer
Bremen lost Torsten Frings and Petri Pasanen on free transfers to Toronto FC and Red Bull Salzburg respectively. The club also lost Peter Niemeyer, who joined Hertha BSC permanently after having been on loan during the 2010–11 season. German international Per Mertesacker also departed, joining Arsenal for a £11 million transfer fee.

Bremen signed Mehmet Ekici from Bayern Munich and Tom Trybull from Hansa Rostock. The club also signed Lukas Schmitz from Schalke 04, Andreas Wolf from 1. FC Nürnberg, while Sokratis Papastathopoulos signed on loan from Genoa. Bremen also signed Florian Hartherz from VfL Wolfsburg and Aleksandar Ignjovski from 1860 Munich.

Transfers Winter
During the winter transfer window, Bremen sold Andreas Wolf and sent Sandro Wagner out on loan, while signing 2010 Austrian Player of the Year Zlatko Junuzović from Austria Wien. Bremen also signed François Affolter from Young Boys on loan.

Competitions

Bundesliga

DFB-Pokal

Player information

Roster and statistics

Transfers

In

Out

Sources

Werder Bremen
SV Werder Bremen seasons